Norfolk is an unincorporated community located in Desoto County, Mississippi, United States. Norfolk Landing (also called Helm's Landing), located a short distance west of Norfolk, was the community's port on the Mississippi River.

History
Norfolk began as a steamboat landing on a plantation belonging to a man named Helms.  In 1854, Norfolk was a small village.

Norfolk Landing was the first port south of the Mississippi-Tennessee border.  In 1862, the newly formed Confederate States of America established a customs office there, and all passing vessels were required to stop and provide a list of cargo.  Regarding this action, historian Marion Bragg wrote:
Men who had previously been neutral and disinterested in the issues which had aroused others in the North were suddenly enraged.  Free navigation of the Mississippi was a natural birthright of every American, the westerners believed, and they would gladly fight to death for it.  The idea of a "foreign power" dictating the terms upon which they could navigate "their river" was unthinkable.

Norfolk had a post office from 1854 to 1913.

Hernando DeSoto Park
Norfolk Landing has been converted into a  public park called "Hernando DeSoto Park", which features a hiking/walking trail, river overlook, picnic area, parking and boat launch.  The park is the only place in DeSoto County with public access to the Mississippi River.

References

External links
Map from 1842 showing the location of Norfolk in Mississippi

Unincorporated communities in DeSoto County, Mississippi
Memphis metropolitan area
Mississippi populated places on the Mississippi River
Unincorporated communities in Mississippi